Hedens IF is a Swedish football club located in Boden.

Background
Hedens IF currently plays in Division 3 Norra Norrland, after the promotion from Division 4 Norrbotten Norra in 2011, which is the fifth tier of Swedish football. They play their home matches at the Olympia, Heden in Boden, which was built using a trencher to dig the foundation.

The club is affiliated to Norrbottens Fotbollförbund.

Season to season

Footnotes

External links
 Hedens IF – Official website
 Hedens IF on Facebook

Sport in Norrbotten County
Football clubs in Norrbotten County
1928 establishments in Sweden